The Torneio Prefeito Lineu Prestes was a tournament organized by Federação Paulista de Futebol (FPF) realized in 1950, with the objective of checking the last preparations for the Estádio do Pacaembu, which was to host the 1950 FIFA World Cup matches. The competition name is in honor of Lineu Prestes, the incumbent mayor of São Paulo in 1950. The tournament was also worth the Troféu Newton Sá e Silva, in honor of the administrator of the Pacaembu stadium.

The four main teams in the capital were invited to the dispute: SC Corinthians, Palmeiras, Portuguesa and São Paulo. The contest format was a simple round-robin.

Matches

Final standings

Champion

References

Football in São Paulo